The 1999 Northeast Conference baseball tournament began on May 7 and ended on May 10, 1999, at The Ballpark at Harbor Yard in Bridgeport, Connecticut.  The league's top four teams competed in the double elimination tournament.  Top-seeded  won their second consecutive, and second overall, tournament championship and earned the Northeast Conference's automatic bid to the 1999 NCAA Division I baseball tournament.

Seeding and format
The two division winners claimed the top two seeds, with the next two teams by conference winning percentage rounding out the field.  They played a double-elimination tournament.

Bracket

Most Valuable Player
Mike Benfield of Monmouth was named Tournament Most Valuable Player.  Benfield pitched in the opener and the final game for the Hawks, allowing 2 earned runs and striking out ten in 10 2/3 innings.

References

Tournament
Northeast Conference Baseball Tournament
Northeast Conference baseball tournament
Northeast Conference baseball tournament